The Omaha Monitor, known as the Monitor for the bulk of its life, was an African American newspaper in Omaha, Nebraska. It ran issues from 1915 to 1929, and focused on the civic participation and racial equality of Omaha's black community. It was founded by John Albert Williams, who left the paper the year prior to its closure.

Publication 
The Monitor was founded in 1915 by John Albert Williams, an African American civic and religious leader and previous writer for the Enterprise, another black Omaha newspaper. He started the paper following the collapse of Enterprise, though an earlier version of it—the Mission Monitor—was in circulation in the late 1890s as a church periodical. The paper was national in its circulation.

The paper advocated for an expansion of civil rights for and civic participation by black people, which included stories devoted to church activities and economic agitation. Williams regularly pushed for his readers to gain a sense of racial pride, though in 1918, after he criticised their existence, he began accepting advertisements for products developed to distort natural Afro-textured hair and black skin. Civic participation was a feature of the Monitor, and the paper successfully rallied protests against a public showing of The Birth of a Nation; in one protest, however, they failed to stop or alter the showing, though the cinema's manager "agreed to print a statement about the good behavior of blacks in the cinema program", according to one historian. The paper was largely supportive of Marcus Garvey.

George Wells Parker was the paper's manager until 1920, when he left to found the New Era, a publication that was stronger in its calls for racial equality. Williams served as the paper's editor until 1928. The paper was given to George H.W. Bullock, who renamed it to the Omaha Monitor until its closure in early 1929.

See also
 List of African-American newspapers in Nebraska
 African Americans in Omaha, Nebraska

References

Citations

Bibliography

 
 
 
 

African-American history in Omaha, Nebraska
African-American newspapers
African-American newspapers published in Omaha, Nebraska
Defunct newspapers published in Nebraska